This is a list of prominent people from the territory that now makes up the U.S. state of West Virginia.

Athletes
A–G

 Michael Barber, professional football player
 Randy Barnes (born 1966), shotputter
 Larry Barnett (born 1945), baseball umpire
 Clair Bee, college basketball coach
 Vern Bickford, professional baseball player
 Brian Bowles, UFC/MMA fighter
 Rich Braham, professional football coach
 George Brett, professional baseball player
 Vicky Bullett, professional basketball player
 Lew Burdette, professional baseball player
 Jesse Burkett, professional baseball player
 Necro Butcher, professional wrestler
 Eddie Cameron, college basketball coach
 Mark Canterbury, professional wrestler
 David Carpenter, professional baseball player
 Bimbo Coles, professional basketball player
 Wilbur Cooper, professional baseball player
 Larry Coyer, professional football coach
 Dan D'Antoni, college basketball coach
 Mike D'Antoni, professional basketball player and coach
 Jack Dempsey, professional boxer
 Jimbo Fisher, college football coach
 Gene Freese, professional baseball player
 George Freese, professional baseball player
 Bob Gain, professional football player
 Frank Gatski, professional football player
 Marshall Goldberg, professional football player
 C. J. Goodwin, professional football player
 Hal Greer, professional basketball player
 Jedd Gyorko, professional baseball player

H–M

 Dennis Harrah, professional football player
 Cam Henderson, college football, basketball, and baseball coach
 Lou Holtz, Hall of Fame college football coach
 Alexis Hornbuckle, professional basketball player
 Jeff Hostetler, professional football player
 J. R. House, professional baseball and football player
 Chuck Howley, professional football player
 Sam Huff, professional football player
 Bob Huggins, college basketball coach
 Hot Rod Hundley, professional basketball player and broadcaster
 Gary Jeter, professional football player
 James Jett, professional football player
 Dwayne Jones, professional basketball player
 Bill Karr, professional football player
 Jason Kincaid, professional wrestler
 John Kruk, professional baseball player
 Carl Lee, professional football player
 Doug Legursky, professional football player
 Gino Marchetti, professional football player
 Rod Martin, professional football player
 Chris Massey, professional football player
 O. J. Mayo, professional basketball player 
 Bill Mazeroski, professional baseball player
 Leo Mazzone, professional baseball player
 Seth McClung, professional baseball player
 John McKay, college and professional football coach
 Leland Merrill, Olympic wrestler, WV's first Olympian 
 Renee Montgomery, professional basketball player
 Eric Moss, professional football player
 Randy Moss, professional football player

N–Z

 Greasy Neale, Hall of Fame college and professional football coach
 Dustin Nippert, professional baseball player
 Jamie Noble, professional wrestler (WWE)
 Buzz Nutter, professional football player
 Peggy O'Neal, Australian Rules football president
 Patrick Patterson, professional basketball player
 Joe Pettini, professional baseball coach
 Kevin Pittsnogle, college basketball player
 Tom Pridemore, professional football player
 Paul Popovich, professional baseball player
 Mary Lou Retton, professional gymnast
 Ira Rodgers, college football coach
 Rich Rodriguez, college football coach
 Nick Saban, professional and college football coach
 Ben Schwartzwalder, Hall of Fame college football coach
 Heath Slater, professional wrestler (WWE)
 Tamar Slay, professional basketball player
 Stephanie Sparks, professional golfer and commentator
 Ray Stevens,  professional wrestler
 Emanuel Steward, boxing trainer
 Bill Stewart, college football coach
 Joe Stydahar, professional football player
 Nick Swisher, professional baseball player
 Steve Swisher, professional baseball player
 Ryan Switzer, professional football player
 Rod Thorn, basketball player and executive
 Rick Tolley, college football coach
 Bill Walker, professional basketball player
 Fulton Walker, professional football player
 Robert Walker, professional football player
 Curt Warner, professional football player
 Jerry West, professional basketball player
 Deron Williams, professional basketball player
 Jason Williams, professional basketball player
 Kayla Williams, world champion gymnast
 Alex Wilson, professional baseball player
 Hack Wilson, professional baseball player
 Quincy Wilson, professional football player
 Steve Yeager, professional baseball player
 Fielding H. Yost, Hall of Fame college football coach
 Guy Zinn, professional baseball player

Business

 Don Blankenship, chief executive officer of Massey Energy
 John T. Chambers, chief executive officer of Cisco Systems
 Carl Keith, inventor
 William Luke, businessman and entrepreneur
 George Preston Marshall, owner and president of Washington Redskins
 William N. Page, civil engineer, entrepreneur, capitalist, businessman, and industrialist
 Milan Puskar, entrepreneur, philanthropist, co-founder of Mylan
 Alex Schoenbaum, founder of Shoney's restaurant chain
 Harry F. Sinclair, industrialist
 Brad D. Smith, chief executive officer of Intuit, Inc.
 Ellsworth Milton Statler, hotel businessman
 Clarence Wayland Watson, businessman
 Allen Harvey Woodward, industrialist

Entertainment
A–G

 Hasil Adkins, musician
 Michael Ammar, magician
 Karen Austin, actress
 Charlie Barnett, actor, comedian
 Lina Basquette, actress
 Leon "Chu" Berry, jazz saxophonist
 Chris Booker, radio DJ, TV personality
 Bobby Campo, actor
 Mark Carman, producer, songwriter
 Jean Carson, actress
 Bernie Casey, actor
 Ted Cassidy, actor
 Joe Cerisano, singer-songwriter
 Michael Cerveris, actor, singer-songwriter
 John Davis Chandler, actor
 Larry Combs, clarinetist
 Stoney Cooper, country/bluegrass singer 
 Wilma Lee Cooper, country/bluegrass singer 
 John Corbett, actor
 Billy Cox, bassist
 George Crumb, composer
 Phyllis Curtin, operatic soprano, NYCO
 Frank De Vol, film composer, actor
 Joyce DeWitt, actress; Three's Company
 Hazel Dickens, bluegrass singer
 Little Jimmy Dickens, country singer; Country Music Hall of Fame inductee
 Brad Divens, vocalist, musician, Wrathchild America, Kix
 Paul Dooley, actor, writer and comedian
 Brad Dourif, actor
 Joanne Dru, actress
 Greg Dulli, singer, The Afghan Whigs
 Virginia Egnor (also known as Dagmar), actress, model, TV personality
 Conchata Ferrell, actress
 Virginia Fox, silent-film actress; frequent co-star with Buster Keaton
 Jennifer Garner, actress
 Randy Gilkey, singer-songwriter
 Larry Groce, musician, radio personality

H–M

 Ed Haley, blind professional fiddler
 Joshua Harto, actor, writer, producer
 Steve Harvey, comedian, TV personality
 Hawkshaw Hawkins, country music singer
 Allison Hayes, actress
 Blind Joe Hill, one-man band
 Frank Hutchison, slide guitar player
 Katie Lee Joel, television host
 Johnnie Johnson, blues musician
 Daniel Johnston, musician, artist; subject of film The Devil and Daniel Johnston
 Lawrence Kasdan, director, producer, screenwriter
 Lesli Kay, actress, As The World Turns, The Bold and the Beautiful
 Fuzzy Knight, actor
 Don Knotts, actor
 Shannon Larkin, musician, Godsmack
 Rex Lease, actor
 Jake E. Lee, rock guitarist
 Kristi Lee, TV personality, director of The Bob & Tom Show
 Traci Lords, adult film star
 Ann Magnuson, actress
 Peter Marshall, musician, actor, host of TV's Hollywood Squares
 Kathy Mattea, country and bluegrass performer
 Charlie McCoy, musician
 Russ McCubbin, actor, stuntman, comedian
 Justin McElroy, Travis McElroy, and Griffin McElroy, hosts of My Brother, My Brother and Me
 Elizabeth McLaughlin, actress
 Garnet Mimms, soul singer
 Landau Eugene Murphy Jr., singer, winner of America's Got Talent, Season 6 (2010)
 Lou Myers, actor

N–Z

 Tim O'Brien, bluegrass musician
 Brooklyn Nelson, actress
 Devon Odessa, producer, actress, My So-Called Life
 Brad Paisley, country singer-songwriter
 Will Pan, rapper, actor
 Sam Pancake, actor
 Squire Parsons, gospel singer
 Johnny Paycheck, country musician
 Rachel Proctor, country singer-songwriter
 Don Redman, jazz musician and bandleader
 Ashlie Rhey, actress, writer
 Jeff Richmond, producer, composer
 Walter E. "Jack" Rollins, songwriter
 Chris Weaver, musician
 Soupy Sales, actor and comedian
 Frank "Poncho" Sampedro, guitarist for Neil Young's band
 Chris Sarandon, actor, activist
 David Selby, actor
 Robert R. Shafer, actor
 Bill Slater, radio personality, host of Twenty Questions
 Connie Smith, country singer, Country Music Hall of Fame inductee
 Fred "Sonic" Smith, guitarist for MC5
 Michael W. Smith,  contemporary Christian singer-songwriter
 Red Sovine, country singer
 Morgan Spurlock, film director, screenwriter
 Blaze Starr, stripper and burlesque star
 Aaron Staton, actor; Mad Men
 Eleanor Steber, soprano, The Metropolitan Opera, NYC
 Josh Stewart, actor
 Sam Trammell, actor, True Blood
 Ryan Upchurch, Country, Rap and Rock song writer
 Teddy Weatherford, jazz pianist
 Patty Weaver, actress
 Donald Ray White, mountain dancer
 Jesse "Jesco" White, mountain dancer
 Steve Whiteman, former Kix singer
 Garland Wilson, jazz pianist
 Melvin Wine, fiddler
 Bill Withers, singer-songwriter
 J. T. Woodruff, Hawthorne Heights singer
 Bobby Wright, country singer
 Frankie Yankovic, polka musician

Frontiersmen

 Patrick Gass, frontiersman
 Morgan Morgan, frontiersman
 Lewis Wetzel, frontiersman

Journalism

 William E. Chilton, newspaper publisher and politician
 J. R. Clifford, journalist, first African-American lawyer in West Virginia; founder of the Pioneer Press
 George Esper, newspaper reporter; known for his coverage of the Vietnam War for the Associated Press
 John S. Knight, newspaper publisher and editor
 Hoda Kotb, television reporter; host of Today
 Molly Line, news correspondent for Fox News Channel
 Herbert Morrison, radio reporter; known for his coverage of the Hindenburg disaster
 Asra Nomani, Indian-American journalist, author, and feminist
 Mike Patrick, sportscaster
 Michael Tomasky, newspaper writer and editor
 Carter G. Woodson, historian, author, and journalist

Literature and art

 Allen Appel, novelist
 Annie Latham Bartlett, sculptor
 John Peale Bishop, poet, man of letters
 Florence V. Brittingham, poet and short story writer
 Pearl S. Buck, writer and Nobel Prize winner
 Bob Carroll, historian, author
 Stephen Coonts, novelist
 Rebecca Harding Davis, short story writer
 Alice Mary Dowd, educator and author
 Henry Louis Gates Jr., author, educator, and scholar
 Denise Giardina, author
 Linda Goodman, poet, novelist, best-selling astrology writer 
 Davis Grubb, novelist
 Charley Harper, artist
 Homer Hickam, writer
 Craig Johnson, novelist
 John Knowles, novelist
 William Robinson Leigh, artist
 Keith Maillard, novelist, poet
 Scott McClanahan, writer
 Brooke McEldowney, cartoonist; creator of 9 Chickweed Lane comic strip
 Ehrman Syme Nadal, author
 Breece D'J Pancake, short fiction writer, author of Trilobites
 Roger Price, creator of Mad Libs and Droodles
 Jedediah Purdy, author and professor
 Mary Lee Settle, author
 Beau Smith, comic book writer
 Jean Edward Smith, biographer
 David Hunter Strother (aka Porte Crayon), artist
 Timothy Truman, writer, artist, and musician
 Jeannette Walls, author and columnist
 Booker T. Washington, political leader, educator, and author
 Tom Wilson, creator of Ziggy comic strip

Military

 John James Abert, explorer and soldier
 Earl E. Anderson, U.S. Marine Corps general
 John Ashby, frontiersman and soldier
 Woodrow Wilson Barr, U.S. Marine
 Ted Belcher, U.S. Army soldier, Medal of Honor recipient
 Ruby Bradley, 
 Frank Buckles, 
 Adelbert Rinaldo Buffington, U.S. Army Brigadier General, 10th Chief of Ordnance for the U.S. Army Ordnance Corps
 French Ensor Chadwick, U.S. Navy officer and educator
 Lynndie England, U.S. Army reservist involved in the Abu Ghraib torture and prisoner abuse scandal
 Stonewall Jackson, C.S. Army general born in Clarksburg and died before the region was formed into West Virginia
 Albert G. Jenkins, general and politician
 Jonah Edward Kelley, U.S. Army soldier; Medal of Honor recipient
 Edwin Gray Lee, C.S. Army general born in Shepherdstown before it became part of the newly formed West Virginia
 Carwood Lipton, U.S. Army soldier
 John P. Lucas, U.S. Army general; commander at Battle of Anzio
 Jessica Lynch, prisoner of war
 Basil L. Plumley, U.S. Army command sergeant major
 William E. Shuck Jr., U.S. Marine, Medal of Honor recipient
 M. Jeff. Thompson, Mo. State Guard general
 Hershel W. Williams, U.S. Marine, Medal of Honor recipient
 John Yarnall, U.S. Navy officer
 Chuck Yeager, aviator

Politics and government

 Newton D. Baker, politician
 William Wallace Barron, politician
 John J. Beckley, frontiersman and Librarian of Congress
 Ephraim Bee, frontiersman and politician
 Charles Bent, frontiersman and politician
 Arthur I. Boreman, politician
 Sylvia Mathews Burwell, politician, University President
 Harry F. Byrd, politician
 Robert Byrd, U.S. Senator and majority leader, longest-serving member of Senate (51 years, 5 months, 21 days) 
 Gaston Caperton, politician
 Shelley Moore Capito, politician
 Thomas R. Carper, economist and politician
 John J. Cornwell, politician
 Henry G. Davis, politician
 John W. Davis, politician and attorney, Democratic Party nominee for U.S. President (1924)
 Stephen Benton Elkins, politician
 Sarah Feinberg (born 1977), Interim President of the New York City Transit Authority, and former Administrator of the Federal Railroad Administration
 Walter Lowrie Fisher, U.S. Secretary of Interior
 Mark Funkhouser, politician; mayor of Kansas City, Missouri
 William E. Glasscock, politician
 Nathan Goff Jr., politician
 Howard Mason Gore, politician
 Henry D. Hatfield, politician
 Ken Hechler, politician and author
 Brad Hoylman (born 1965), New York State Senator
 John J. Jacob, politician
 Evan Jenkins, state senator
 Elizabeth Kee, politician
 John E. Kenna, politician
 Chief Logan, Native-American leader
 William A. MacCorkle, politician
 Joe Manchin, politician
 William C. Marland, politician
 Thomas Massie, congressman
 Bruce Marks (born 1957), politician
 Roy L. McCulty, politician
 Arch A. Moore Jr., politician
 Dwight Morrow, diplomat; father-in-law of Charles Lindbergh
 Matthew M. Neely, politician
 Bob Ney, politician
 William Smith O'Brien, Representative
 Okey L. Patteson, politician
 Francis Harrison Pierpont, politician, "father of West Virginia"
 Nick Rahall, politician
 Jennings Randolph, politician
 Absalom Willis Robertson, politician
 Jay Rockefeller, politician
 Hulett C. Smith, politician
 William E. Stevenson, politician
 Cecil H. Underwood, politician 
 Cyrus Vance, U.S. Secretary of State
 Charles Washington, statesman
 Erik Wells, politician and news anchor 
 Kelli Ward, politician
 Bob Wise, politician

Religion

 Alexander Campbell, Restoration Movement leader
 Matthew W. Clair, Methodist Episcopal Church bishop
 Belle Caldwell Culbertson, missionary, author, philanthropist
 T. D. Jakes, televangelist
 B. R. Lakin, evangelist

Science

 Eugene Aserinsky, discovered rapid eye movement sleep (REM)
 Maurice Brooks, ornithologist
 Earl Lemley Core, botanist
 Homer Hickam, former NASA engineer
 Andrew Delmar Hopkins, entomologist
 Katherine Johnson, mathematician and NASA computer scientist 
 Carl D. Keith, chemist, invented three-way catalytic converter
 Angie Turner King, chemist, mathematician and educator 
 Mahlon Loomis, inventor of the wireless telegraph
 Robert J. Marks II, electrical engineer
 Joseph Maroon, neurosurgeon
 Jon McBride, NASA astronaut; pilot of Space Shuttle Challenger mission STS-41-G (1984)
 Adrian Melott, physicist and cosmologist
 George A. Miller, psychologist and cognitive scientist
 John Forbes Nash, mathematician
 James Rumsey, inventor and mechanical engineer
 Charles Marstiller Vest, educator and mechanical engineer

Other

 James J. Andrews, espionage agent
 Bill Blizzard, labor leader
 Julia Bonds, environmental activist; winner of Goldman Prize
 Belle Boyd, espionage agent
 James Caudy, frontiersman and early settler of present day West Virginia
 Larry Gibson, environmental activist; founder of Keeper of the Mountains Foundation
 Nancy Hanks, mother of Abraham Lincoln; distant cousin of Tom Hanks
 Devil Anse Hatfield, patriarch of Hatfield clan of 19th-century Hatfield–McCoy feud
 Sid Hatfield, Matewan police chief, prominent figure in labor history
 Jacob and Samuel Hawken, designers of Hawken rifle
 John Henry, steel-driving man of folklore
 Glen and Bessie Hyde, disappeared raftsmen
 Julia Neale Jackson, mother of Stonewall Jackson
 Anna Jarvis, founder of Mother's Day in United States
 Mary Harris "Mother" Jones, labor and community organizer
 Charles Manson, convicted murderer
 Randal McCloy, lone survivor of 2006 Sago Mine disaster
 James Mulroy, Wheeling's prodigal son; environmental advocate
 Stephen Murphy, ex-DEA agent; along with Javier Peña, one of the lead investigators in the manhunt of Colombian drug smuggler Pablo Escobar
 Harry Powers, serial killer
 Patsy Paugh Ramsey, Miss West Virginia; mother of JonBenét Ramsey
 Walter Reuther, labor leader
 Cecil Roberts, United Mine Workers president
 Leon Sullivan, civil rights activist
 Harry R. Truman, volcano victim; owner of lodge at Mount St. Helens
 Jack Whittaker, lottery winner

See also

 List of Marshall University people
 List of West Virginia University alumni

References

Lists of people from West Virginia